Hahncappsia chiapasalis is a moth in the family Crambidae described by Hahn William Capps in 1967. It is found in Chiapas, Mexico.

The wingspan is about 22 mm. The forewings and hindwings are uniform brownish yellow.

References

Moths described in 1967
Pyraustinae